Dewey Willis Selmon (born November 19, 1953) is a former football linebacker.  He played collegiate football at University of Oklahoma, forming the defensive line with brothers Lucious and Lee Roy, among others.

He went on to play for the Tampa Bay Buccaneers and the San Diego Chargers in the National Football League (NFL).

He earned a Ph.D. in Philosophy from the University of Oklahoma. He is a member of the College Academic Hall of Fame.

References

1953 births
Living people
People from Eufaula, Oklahoma
All-American college football players
American football linebackers
Oklahoma Sooners football players
San Diego Chargers players
Tampa Bay Buccaneers players
Players of American football from Oklahoma